William Henderson (1878–1945) was a Scottish footballer who played as a full-back for various clubs in England at the turn of the 20th century.

Football career

Early career
Henderson was born in Broxburn, West Lothian and started his career with the local team, Broxburn Athletic, before signing for English First Division club, Everton in November 1896.

Unable to break into the Everton first-team, the following summer Henderson moved south to join Reading in the Southern League where he spent the next four years.

Southampton
In the summer of 1901, he moved to the south coast, to join Southern League champions, Southampton. Described as "a capable defender (who) tackled strongly and was quick to the ball" his major weakness was his "over-zealousness".

He made his debut for the "Saints" playing at right-back in the opening match of the 1901–02 season, a 1–1 draw with New Brompton at The Dell. Unfortunately for Henderson, his time with the Saints coincided with that of C. B. Fry, the famous amateur right-back – as a consequence, Henderson was required to stand down whenever Fry was available to play. Although Henderson made 21 league appearances (including one at right-half) whereas Fry only played nine league matches, Fry was selected for all the club's matches in the FA Cup in which they made it all the way through to the Final where they lost 2–1 to Sheffield United after a replay.

Frustrated by the lack of regular first-team football, Henderson decided to return to Everton in the 1902 close season.

Everton
Henderson made his Everton debut on 13 September 1902, replacing William Balmer in a 1–0 defeat to Newcastle United. Henderson went on to make 13 appearances in the 1902–03 season and two the following year, before returning to Reading in the summer of 1904.

Later career
Henderson remained at Reading for two years, before returning to the Football League to join Clapton Orient in the Second Division in August 1906. In his two seasons with Clapton Orient, he became the regular choice at right-back, replacing the veteran Billy Holmes.

In 1908, Henderson moved back to the Southern League with New Brompton, where he finished his career. He joined the club at the same time as another player also called William Henderson, and the two played alongside each other on six occasions.

References

External links
Everton profile

1878 births
1945 deaths
Scottish footballers
Association football fullbacks
English Football League players
Southern Football League players
Everton F.C. players
Reading F.C. players
Southampton F.C. players
Leyton Orient F.C. players
Gillingham F.C. players
Sportspeople from Broxburn, West Lothian
Footballers from West Lothian
Broxburn Athletic F.C. players